Donald Ray Murray (November 8, 1945 – March 22, 1996) was an American drummer and Hanna-Barbera animator, best known for his work with the Turtles.  After leaving the group, Murray played with Paul Williams's psychedelic folk group the Holy Mackerel. In the 1980s he went on to perform with the newly formed Surfaris.

Early life
Murray grew up in Inglewood, California and started playing drums at the age of 15. He became popular playing high school dances with the band the Crossfires.

Career

The Turtles 

The Crossfires released one album, Out Of Control, in 1963. By 1965, the Crossfires became the Turtles, but the band had troubles playing at most Southern California venues such as the Whisky a Go Go and the Troubadour, because all members of the band were under 21.

As the band went from high school band "Don Murray And The Crossfires" to "The Turtles", they signed to White Whale Records in 1965. As a member of the Turtles, he played on their debut and second album; It Ain't Me Babe (1965) and You Baby (1966). After appearances on Shindig!, Where the Action Is, and Hullabaloo, as well as a cameo in the 1966 film Out of Sight, Turtles frontman Howard Kaylan and the other band members tossed Murray out of The Turtles after their first gig in New York City, saying "Don thought it was still his high school band".

Murray was interviewed along with former Turtle members Howard Kaylan, Mark Volman, Jim Tucker, Chuck Portz, Jim Pons, and Johnny Barbata in the 1991 documentary “The Turtles: Happy Together”.

The Holy Mackerel 

In 1968, Paul Williams, who was still a struggling musician trying to make it big in the music industry, recruited Murray to join his Psychedelic folk group The Holy Mackerel. In March 1968, the Holy Mackerel began work on their self-titled album at Sunset Sound Studios in Los Angeles.

During process on the album, Don left to continue performing independently, and was replaced by Dewey Martin, previously of Buffalo Springfield.

The Sufaris 
In 1981, Murray was a member of the reformed version of the surf rock group The Surfaris. His only credit with the band is a 1983 live album.

Later life 
In the 1970s Murray was an art director for Skateboarder magazine, and also for Hot Rod magazine. By the 1980s, he was working as an animator for Hanna-Barbera.

Death 
Murray was admitted to a hospital in January 1996 for ulcer surgery, and died two months later in Santa Monica, California on March 22 from complications of the surgery aged 50.

Discography

The Turtles 

 It Ain't Me Babe (1965)
 You Baby (1966)

The Holy Mackerel 

 The Holy Mackerel (1968)

The Surfaris 

 Surf Party! The Best of The Surfaris Live! (1983)

References

External links
Don Murray memorial at Surfrider.org

1945 births
1996 deaths
The Turtles members
20th-century American drummers
American male drummers
20th-century American male musicians